Not to be confused with the 19th-century wood-engraver Henry Linton (1815–1899).

Henry Linton (11 July 1838 – 24 August 1866) was an English first-class cricketer and an officer in the Indian Civil Service.

The son of Rev. Henry Linton, he was born in July 1838 at St Neots, Huntingdonshire. He was educated at Harrow School, before matriculating at Wadham College, Oxford in 1857, graduating B.A. in 1860. While studying at Oxford, he played first-class cricket for Oxford University on four occasions in 1858 and 1859, including two appearances in The University Match against Cambridge University. He scored 44 runs with a high score of 22 in his four first-class matches, in addition to taking 4 wickets with best figures of 2 for 38. After graduating from Oxford, he joined the Indian Civil Service. Linton died in British India at Madras in August 1866. His brother, Sydney, was also a first-class cricketer.

References

External links

1838 births
1866 deaths
People from St Neots
People educated at Harrow School
Alumni of Wadham College, Oxford
English cricketers
Oxford University cricketers
Indian Civil Service (British India) officers